Rika Kaseda (born 2 March 1999) is a Japanese long-distance runner. She competed in the senior women's race at the 2019 IAAF World Cross Country Championships held in Aarhus, Denmark. She finished in 46th place.

In 2019, she won the silver medal in the women's half marathon at the Summer Universiade held in Naples, Italy. She also won the gold medal in the women's half marathon team event.

References

External links 
 

Living people
1999 births
Place of birth missing (living people)
Japanese female long-distance runners
Japanese female cross country runners
Universiade gold medalists in athletics (track and field)
Universiade silver medalists in athletics (track and field)
Universiade gold medalists for Japan
Universiade silver medalists for Japan
Medalists at the 2019 Summer Universiade
21st-century Japanese women